Mack Norman Cleveland Jr. (July 9, 1924 – October 17, 2010), was an attorney and politician from Sanford, Florida, who served in the Florida State Legislature from 1953 to 1965.

Education and military service
He graduated from Seminole High School in 1942 and attended the University of Florida before joining the United States Army Air Corps in the Pacific Theater during WWII. He was commissioned in the United States Air Force Reserve during the Korean Conflict. He earned a BS/BA from Stetson University in 1949 and JD from Stetson University College of Law in 1951.

References

1924 births
2010 deaths
People from Sanford, Florida
Florida Democrats
Florida Republicans
Members of the Florida House of Representatives
Florida state senators
United States Army soldiers
United States Army Air Forces personnel of World War II
United States Air Force personnel of the Korean War
United States Air Force reservists
Florida lawyers
Seminole High School (Seminole County, Florida) alumni
University of Florida alumni
Stetson University alumni
Baptists from Florida
American Congregationalists
Neurological disease deaths in Florida
Deaths from Parkinson's disease
People from Longwood, Florida
20th-century American politicians
20th-century American lawyers
20th-century Baptists